The 1992 West Virginia gubernatorial election took place on November 7, 1992. Incumbent Democratic Governor Gaston Caperton won re-election by defeating former Republican U.S. Representative Cleve Benedict and Democratic State Senator Charlotte Pritt, who ran as an independent write-in candidate after losing to Caperton in the Democratic primary election. Benedict had defeated Vernon Criss for his party's nomination, this election being the first time since 1960 that the Republicans had nominated someone other than Arch A. Moore or Cecil H. Underwood. Until 2020 this is the last time West Virginia has voted for the same party for Governor and for President, as both elections are held concurrently in the state. This is the most recent time that Democrats won both races concurrently.

Democratic primary

Candidates 

 Gaston Caperton, Incumbent
 Charlotte Pritt, State Senator
 Mario Palumbo, Incumbent Attorney General
 Larry Butcher
 Rodger Belknap

Results

See also
Source:

References

1992
Gubernatorial
West Virginia